Matti Pellonpää (28 March 1951 in Helsinki – 13 July 1995 in Vaasa) was a Finnish actor and a musician. He rose to international fame with his roles in both Aki Kaurismäki's and Mika Kaurismäki's films; particularly being a regular in Aki's films, appearing in 18 of them.

Career
He started his career in 1962 as a radio actor at the Finnish state-owned broadcasting company YLE. He performed as an actor during the 1970s in many amateur theatres, at the same time that he studied at the Finnish Theatre Academy, where he completed his studies in the year 1977.

He was nominated Best Actor by European Film Academy for his role as Rodolfo in La Vie de Boheme and won the Felix at the European Film Awards in 1992. He also starred in Jim Jarmusch's 1991 film Night on Earth.

His private life melded seamlessly with his acting work. He was considered a natural bohemian, and a genuine everyman without ego. He frequently used his own life as a basis for his acting, eschewing wardrobe provided, acting in his own clothes.  He had a tattoo of Snoopy on his left bicep.

Pellonpää was the frontman for the band Peltsix (1989–1995). Peltsix gained cult following with its tragic, and at the same time, comic songs. Peltsix's songs were composed by Pale Saarinen, Kari Makkonen and Jukka Haikonen.

Matti Pellonpää died of a heart attack on 13 July 1995 at the age of 44. He was buried in the Malmi Cemetery.

In 1996, Pellonpää was one of the people commemorating 100 years of Finnish Cinema on a stamp.

A Finnish documentary film Boheemi elää/Bohemian Eyes on Pellonpää's life was made in 2011 (directed by Janne Kuusi).

Filmography 

 Pojat (1962), director Mikko Niskanen
 Akseli and Elina (1970), director Edvin Laine
 Kesän maku (1975), director Asko Tolonen
 Antti Puuhaara (1976), director Katariina Lahti, Heikki Partanen, Riitta Rautoma
 Viimeinen savotta (1977), director Edvin Laine
 Ruskan jälkeen (1979), director Edvin Laine
 The Liar (1981), director Mika Kaurismäki
 Pedon merkki (1981), director Jaakko Pakkasvirta
 Jackpot2 (1982), director Mika Kaurismäki
 Arvottomat (1982), director Mika Kaurismäki
 Regina ja miehet (1983), director Anssi Mänttäri
 Huhtikuu on kuukausista julmin (1983), director Anssi Mänttäri
 Crime and Punishment (1983), director Aki Kaurismäki
 Klaani – tarina Sammakoitten suvusta (1984), director Mika Kaurismäki
 Kello (1984), director Anssi Mänttäri
 Aikalainen (1984), director Timo Linnasalo
 Rakkauselokuva (1984), director Anssi Mänttäri
 Viimeiset rotannahat (1985), director Anssi Mänttäri
 Calamari Union (1985), director Aki Kaurismäki
 Ylösnousemus (1985), director Anssi Mänttäri
 Shadows in Paradise (1986), director Aki Kaurismäki
 Rocky VI (1986), director Aki Kaurismäki
 Kuningas lähtee Ranskaan (1986), director Anssi Mänttäri
 Näkemiin, hyvästi (1986), director Anssi Mänttäri
 Hamlet liikemaailmassa (1987), director Aki Kaurismäki
 Ariel (1988), director Aki Kaurismäki
 Cha cha cha (1989), director Mika Kaurismäki
 Leningrad Cowboys Go America (1989), director Aki Kaurismäki
 Kiljusen herrasväen uudet seikkailut (1990), director Matti Kuortti
 Räpsy ja Dolly (1990), director Matti Ijäs
 Zombie ja kummitusjuna (1991), director Mika Kaurismäki
 Night on Earth (1991), director Jim Jarmusch
 Kadunlakaisijat (1991), director Olli Soinio
 La Vie de Bohème (1992), director Aki Kaurismäki
 Missä on Musette? (1992), director Veikko Nieminen
 Papukaijamies (1992), director Veikko Nieminen
 Det var väl själva fan också (1993), director Peter Östlund
 The Last Border (1993), director Mika Kaurismäki
 Hobitit (1993), director Timo Torikka
 Leningrad Cowboys Meet Moses (1993), director Aki Kaurismäki
 Take Care of Your Scarf, Tatiana (1993), director Aki Kaurismäki
 Iron Horsemen (1995), director Gilles Charmant
 Sirpaleita (1996), director Aku Louhimies

Albums
 Peltsix / Lihaa Ja Leikkeleitä (Megamania Music, 1991)
 Peltsix / Silkkaa Kryptoniittia (Flamingo Music, 1993)

References

Literature
 Lähikuvassa Matti Pellonpää (Lauri Timonen, Otava 2009)

External links
 Matti Pellonpää entry at IMDb
 PELTSIX MySpace
 Se minun töistäni — a documentary on Matti Pellonpää from 1984.

1951 births
1995 deaths
Male actors from Helsinki
European Film Award for Best Actor winners
20th-century Finnish male actors